Lara Calleja (born 1988) is a Maltese writer. She was raised in the village of Marsaskala, and worked in tourism and as a librarian. Her debut novel, Lucy Min?, appeared in 2016 and was nominated for the Maltese National Book Prize. In 2020, she quit her career in tourism to become a freelance writer and translator. Her second book, Kissirtu Kullimkien (You Have Destroyed Everything), won the National Book Prize for new writers. This book also won the 2021 EU Prize for Literature. 

Lara is also a playwright; her debut play Taralalla was staged at the Spazju Kreattiv venue in Valletta in late 2021.

References

1988 births
Living people
Maltese women writers
Maltese dramatists and playwrights